Arabianus was a Christian writer of the 2nd century.

Arabianus may also refer to:

People
 Flavius Arabianus, third-century praefectus annonae
 Gnaeus Claudius Severus Arabianus, Roman senator of the 2nd century
 Arabianus, 4th century bishop of Ancyra

Other uses
 Bako arabianus, a species in the genus Bako